Colby Gossett (born June 23, 1995) is an American football guard for the Atlanta Falcons of the National Football League (NFL). He played college football at Appalachian State. Gossett was named to the first-team All-Sun Belt as a junior and senior.

Professional career

Minnesota Vikings 
Gossett was drafted by the Minnesota Vikings in the sixth round (213th overall) of the 2018 NFL Draft. On May 3, 2018, he signed his rookie contract. He was waived on September 1, 2018 and was signed to the practice squad the next day.

Arizona Cardinals 
On October 30, 2018, Gossett was signed by the Arizona Cardinals off the Vikings' practice squad. On August 31, 2019, the Cardinals released Gossett.

New England Patriots 
On September 2, 2019, Gossett was signed to the New England Patriots practice squad. He was released on September 11.

Cleveland Browns
Gossett was signed to the Cleveland Browns' practice squad on September 12, 2019. He was promoted to the active roster on December 24, 2019.

On August 5, 2020, Gossett announced he would opt out of the 2020 season due to the COVID-19 pandemic.

Gossett was waived by the Browns on August 31, 2021.

Atlanta Falcons
On September 1, 2021, Gossett was claimed off of waivers by his hometown team the Atlanta Falcons, which also reunited him with Dwayne Ledford, the Falcons OL coach and Gossett’s coach at Appalachian State.

On March 17, 2022, Gossett signed a deal with the Falcons.

References

External links
Appalachian State Mountaineers bio

1995 births
Living people
People from Cumming, Georgia
Sportspeople from the Atlanta metropolitan area
Players of American football from Georgia (U.S. state)
American football offensive guards
Appalachian State Mountaineers football players
Minnesota Vikings players
Arizona Cardinals players
New England Patriots players
Cleveland Browns players
Atlanta Falcons players